William VIII (10 March 1682 – 1 February 1760) ruled the German Landgraviate Hesse-Kassel from 1730 until his death, first as regent (1730–1751) and then as landgrave (1751–1760).

Life
Born in Kassel, he was the seventh son of Charles I, Landgrave of Hesse-Kassel and Maria Amalia of Courland.  After his elder brother Frederick became King of Sweden in 1720 and his father died in 1730, he became de facto ruler of Hesse-Kassel. He officially became landgrave after his brother's death on 25 March 1751.

Five years later, the Seven Years' War began and William joined with the Prussian and British forces.  Hesse-Kassel became an important battlefield and was occupied by France on several occasions. He had a deep, personal friendship with Frederick the Great, King of Prussia, and Holy Roman Emperor Charles VII.

His second son and successor, Frederick, became a Catholic, which led to restrictions on Catholicism in the Calvinist landgraviate and the transfer of the Principality of Hanau to his Protestant grandson William.

During his reign, William started building Schloss Wilhelmsthal in Calden and collected paintings, including works by Rembrandt.

Family
In 1717, William married Dorothea Wilhelmina (20 March 1691 – 17 March 1743), eldest daughter of Maurice William, Duke of Saxe-Zeitz.
They had three children: 
Charles (21 August 1718 – 17 October 1719); 
Frederick (1720 – 1785), his successor;   
Maria Amalia (7 July 1721 – 19 November 1744).

He died at Rinteln in 1760.

Ancestry

References

 
 Reinhard Dietrich (1996) (in German). Die Landesverfassung in dem Hanauischen = Hanauer Geschichtsblätter 34. Hanau. 
 Bernhard Schnackenburg (2000) (in German). Landgraf Wilhelm VIII. von Hessen-Kassel, Gründer der Kasselerer Gemäldegalerie. In: Heide Wunder (Ed.): Kassel im 18. Jahrhundert. Kassel. S. 71–87.
 Wolf von Both/Hans Vogt (Ed.) (1964) (in German). Landgraf Wilhelm VIII. von Hessen-Kassel. Ein Fürst der Rokokozeit = Veröffentlichungen der Historischen Kommission für Hessen und Waldeck, Bd. 27,1/ Schriften zur Hessischen Kulturgeschichte, Bd. 1. Munich.
 Franz Carl Theodor Piderit (1844) (in German). Geschichte der Haupt- und Residenzstadt Kassel S. 304 ff.

|-

Landgraves of Hesse-Kassel
People from the Landgraviate of Hesse-Kassel
1682 births
1760 deaths
Landgraves of Hesse
German Calvinist and Reformed Christians
18th-century German people
Recipients of the Order of the White Eagle (Poland)